The Perm Central Mosque was built in 1902 and 1903 in the Tatar district of Perm, Russia. Its construction was financed by the local Tatar merchant families. The striped green-and-white building with a tapering minaret was designed by Alexander Ozhegov. For some years it was the northernmost mosque in the world until superseded by the Nord Kamal Mosque in Norilsk.

After the Russian Revolution the mosque was shut down. The building was used for storing the Communist Party archives between 1940 and 1986. Religious activities in the mosque were resumed in 1990.

See also 
Islam in Russia
List of mosques in Russia
List of mosques in Europe

References 

Buildings and structures in Perm, Russia
Mosques in Russia
Mosques completed in 1903
Closed mosques in the Soviet Union
1903 establishments in the Russian Empire
Mosques in Europe
Cultural heritage monuments of regional significance in Perm Krai